Tseng Li-cheng (old name: Tseng Pei-hua, ; born 26 December 1986) is a Taiwanese taekwondo practitioner of aboriginal origin (tribe: Amis). At the 2012 Summer Olympics, she won the bronze medal in the Taekwondo Women's 57 kg.

References

External links
 
 

Amis people
Taiwanese female taekwondo practitioners
Living people
Olympic taekwondo practitioners of Taiwan
Taekwondo practitioners at the 2012 Summer Olympics
Olympic bronze medalists for Taiwan
Olympic medalists in taekwondo
People from Taitung County
1986 births
Asian Games medalists in taekwondo
Taekwondo practitioners at the 2002 Asian Games
Taekwondo practitioners at the 2006 Asian Games
Taekwondo practitioners at the 2010 Asian Games
Taekwondo practitioners at the 2014 Asian Games
Medalists at the 2012 Summer Olympics
Asian Games silver medalists for Chinese Taipei
Asian Games bronze medalists for Chinese Taipei
Medalists at the 2002 Asian Games
Medalists at the 2006 Asian Games
World Taekwondo Championships medalists
Asian Taekwondo Championships medalists
21st-century Taiwanese women